Per Jan Ingebrigtsen (born June 19, 1946 in Stord, Norway) is a Norwegian writer and director. He teaches drama at Stord vidaregåande skule.

Selected written works

Poetry
Rotbløyte (1975)
Etter ei regnskur (1979)

Children's novels
Sofus på landet (1983)
Chathrines blues, Helges rus (1983)

Collected stories

Sentimental (2003)
Diktboka (1999)
Ut og plukke viser ("Rosa Lind", "Stille kveldar i mai", Samlaget.)
Låvesvalens svanesang (1979)
Språkforming – Norsk språklære for ungdomsskulen (1998)
Grunnbok i norsk for 9. klasse (1998)

As director

Hair (1995)
Grease (2002)
Fame (2005)
We Will Rock You (2008)
Spelemann på taket (2011)

References

1946 births
Living people
Norwegian male writers
Nynorsk-language writers
People from Stord